Cecil Yekuthial Linder (March 10, 1921 – April 10, 1992)  was a Polish-born Canadian film and television actor. He was Jewish and managed to escape Poland before the Holocaust. In the 1950s and 1960s, he worked extensively in the United Kingdom, often playing Canadian and American characters in various films and television programmes.

In television, he is best remembered for playing Dr. Matthew Roney in the BBC serial Quatermass and the Pit (1958–59). In film, he is best remembered for his role as James Bond's friend, CIA agent Felix Leiter, in Goldfinger (1964). Another well-known film in which he appeared was Lolita (1962), as Doctor Keegee.

Career
He was raised in Timmins, Ontario where his father was a rabbi to the Jewish community. During his early years of his professional career, Linder worked as an announcer at CKGB in Timmins.

Linder enjoyed an extensive and successful television career on both sides of the Atlantic. In the UK, probably his most prominent role was as the palaeontologist Roney in the original BBC version of Quatermass and the Pit (1958–59).

In the United States, he was a regular in the CBS soap operas The Secret Storm and  The Edge of Night and in the 1980s appeared in several of the Perry Mason revival TV films as District Attorney Jack Welles.

Linder was also a regular on the popular 1980s Canadian crime series Seeing Things, playing Crown Attorney Spenser.

During his career, he also had guest roles in episodes of a variety of other popular British, American and Canadian television programmes, including: The Forest Rangers, Doomwatch, The Littlest Hobo, Alfred Hitchcock Presents, Ironside, The Saint, Danger Bay, The New Avengers, The Secret Storm (as Peter Ames), and The Edge of Night as Senator Ben Travis #2.

Linder appeared as Inspector Cramer in the CBC 1982 radio dramatizations of Nero Wolfe short stories.

Linder's last work was as Syd Grady in two episodes of the television series Sweating Bullets (1991).

He died the following year at Mount Sinai Hospital in Toronto of complications from emphysema.

He accumulated over 225 credits in film and television productions in a long performing career.

Selected filmography

Flaming Frontier (1958) as Capt. Dan Carver
Subway in the Sky (1959) as Carson
Jet Storm (1959) as Colonel Coe
SOS Pacific (1959) as Willy
Too Young to Love (1959) as Mr. Bill
Crack in the Mirror (1960) as Murzeau
Lolita (1962) as Dr. Keegee
Goldfinger (1964) as Felix Leiter
 The Verdict (Edgar Wallace Mysteries)(1964) as Joe Armstrong
Tecnica di un omicidio (1966) as Gastel
Quentin Durgens, M.P. (1966) as Sherwin
Do Not Fold, Staple, Spindle or Mutilate (1967)
Explosion (1969) as Mr. Evans
Innocent Bystanders (1972) as Mankowitz
The Sloane Affair (1973) as Roy Maxwell
Super Bitch (1973) as American Ambassador
A Touch of Class (1973) as Wendell Thompson
To Kill the King (1974) as Stephen Van Birchard
Old God Knows (1974) as Mr. Klein
Why Rock the Boat? (1974) as Carmichael
Sunday in the Country (1974) as Ackerman
Second Wind (1976) as Graham
Point of No Return (1976) as Professor Johns
The Clown Murders (1976) as The Developer
Age of Innocence (1977) as Dr. Hogarth
Deadly Harvest (1977) as Henry the Chairman
Three Dangerous Ladies (1977) as Dr. Carstairs (segment: "The Mannikin")
The Case of Barbara Pasons (1978) as Loren Bowley
Drága kisfiam (1978) as Mr. George
Tomorrow Never Comes (1978) as Milton
High-Ballin' (1978) as Policeman
I Miss You, Hugs and Kisses (1978) as Chief Parker
Something's Rotten (1979) as Alexis Alexander
City on Fire (1979) as Councilman Paley
Lost and Found (1979) as Mr. Sanders
An American Christmas Carol (1979) as Auctioneer
Virus (1980) as Dr. Latour
Atlantic City (1980) as President of Hospital
Deadly Eyes (1982) as Dr. Louis Spenser
Heavenly Bodies (1985) as Walter Matheson
Honeymoon (1985) as Barnes

References

External links

Cec Linder at FelixLeiter.com

1921 births
1992 deaths
Canadian male film actors
Canadian male television actors
Canadian male voice actors
Canadian male soap opera actors
Polish emigrants to Canada
Deaths from emphysema
Male actors from Toronto
People from Żywiec County
20th-century Canadian male actors